The Belizean ambassador in Washington, D. C. is the official representative of the Government in Belmopan to the Government of the United States.

List of representatives

Belize–United States relations

References 

 
United States
Belize